Private Eye Action, as You Like It is a collection of short stories from early in the careers of Joe R. Lansdale and Lewis Shiner, published in a limited edition by Crossroads Press in 1998.  They have never been made available in other collections and are now extremely rare.

The Lansdale solo stories feature a character named Ray Slater; Lansdale also wrote a Ray Slater novel, unpublished at the time but later included in For a Few Stories More.  After the mysteries did not catch on, Lansdale published the western novel Texas Night Riders using Ray Slater as a pseudonym (it was eventually re-published under his own name).  Shiner possibly wrote two of the three Sloane stories specifically for inclusion in this collection.  In the late-1970s, Lansdale and Shiner collaborated on a few stories about John Talbot; both were published, though at least one of them was heavily edited prior to publication.

It includes:

Joe Lansdale's Ray Slater stories
Introduction to the Slater stories
The Full Count  {originally published in Mike Shayne Mystery Magazine, June 1978}
Long Gone Forever  {originally published in Mike Shayne Mystery Magazine, Dec 1978}
One Blonde, Well Dead  {originally published in Mike Shayne Mystery Magazine, Apr 1979}
Lewis Shiner's Sloane Stories
The Short Unhappy Career of Lew Shiner, Tough-Guy Writer (introduction)
Deep, Without Pity  {originally published in Mike Shayne Mystery Magazine, June 1980}
The Killing Season  {first publication}
Prodigal Son  {first publication}
Lansdale & Shiner - the John Talbot Stories
Can You Run With It? (introduction, by Lewis Shiner)
Black As The Night  {originally published in Mike Shayne Mystery Magazine, Sep 1979}
Man Drowning  {originally published in an edited form in Pulpsmith, Fall 1983}
Afterword to the Talbot Stories by Joe R. Lansdale

Short story collections by Joe R. Lansdale
1998 short story collections
Mystery short story collections
Works by Joe R. Lansdale